Gazdan (also Romanized as Gazdān; also known as Gezu) is a village in Arad Rural District, Arad District, Gerash County, Fars Province, Iran. At the 2006 census, its population was 30, in 6 families.

References 

Populated places in Gerash County